Claude Sandoz (born 14 March 1946) is a Swiss visual artist. He has worked in painting, drawing, mural painting, stained glass, graphics, public art, watercolor, and printmaking.

Biography  
Claude Sandoz was born in 1946 in Zürich, Switzerland. Sandoz was a student of Max von Mühlenen. He continued his studies in Rome and Amsterdam.

In 1983, he was awarded the Manor Cultural Prize in the Canton of Lucerne.

See also 
 List of Swiss painters

References 

1946 births
Living people
Artists from Zürich
Swiss painters
20th-century Swiss painters
21st-century Swiss painters
Swiss graphic designers